Geastrum entomophilum is an inedible species of mushroom belonging to the genus Geastrum, or earthstar fungi. Found in northeast Brazil in 2008, the species was found with beetles inhabiting the spore sac, likely contributing to spore dissemination.

References

Fungi described in 2008
Fungi of Brazil
entomophilum
Inedible fungi